Coopers Creek is a small rural community near Oxford in the Waimakariri District, New Zealand. It has only eight roads, and no shops. It has a number of mountains and walking tracks. In 1901, Coopers Creek had a population of 168.

Climate
The average temperature in summer is 16.2 °C, and in winter is 5.9 °C.

References

Waimakariri District
Populated places in Canterbury, New Zealand